Nathan E. Lane (September 8, 1862 – 1948) was a member of the Wisconsin State Assembly.

Lane was born in Waushara County, Wisconsin.

Career
Lane was elected to the Assembly in 1900 and was re-elected in 1902. Previously, he had served as Treasurer and Mayor of Phillips, Wisconsin. He was a Republican. He died in 1948 and was buried in Phillips, Wisconsin.

References

People from Waushara County, Wisconsin
People from Phillips, Wisconsin
Republican Party members of the Wisconsin State Assembly
Mayors of places in Wisconsin
1862 births
1948 deaths